Waldron-Haslam is an album by jazz pianist Mal Waldron and baritone saxophonist George Haslam recorded in 1994 and released on the English Slam label.

Reception
The Allmusic review by Steve Loewy states: "The two musicians are fully in sync, aside from the few times, particularly on the improvised pieces, where there is a tendency to ramble. Haslam boasts a singularly attractive, thin tone that balances the pianist's dense styling. The commanding improvisations by both Haslam and Waldron straddle the boundaries of free and post-bop jazz in a compellingly charming way."

Track listing
All compositions by Mal Waldron and George Haslam except as indicated
 "I Got It Bad (and That Ain't Good)" (Duke Ellington, Paul Francis Webster) — 8:16
 "If I Were a Bell" (Frank Loesser) — 8:08
 "Catch as Catch Should" — 7:09
 "Somewhere" (Leonard Bernstein, Stephen Sondheim) — 5:41
 "Variations on Brahms 3, Mvt.3" (Johannes Brahms, Mal Waldron) — 4:49
 "A Time for Duke" (Waldron) — 7:04
 "The Vortex" (George Haslam) — 8:45
 "Motion in Order" — 18:47
Recorded in Cambridgeshire, England on February 24, 1994

Personnel
Mal Waldron — piano
George Haslam — baritone saxophone

References

1994 albums
Mal Waldron albums
George Haslam albums